Bolak or bulak may refer to:

 Bolak language, disused constructed language invented by Léon Bollack in 1899
 Bolaq, channel in Kazan, the capital city of Republic of Tatarstan, Russia
 Bulak, Sındırgı, village in Turkey
 Bulak, Surabaya, subdistrict of Surabaya, Java, Indonesia

See also
 Boulac Corniche (or Boulak Corniche)
 Boulak Bridge (aka Abou El Ela Bridge)
 Boulaq, district of Cairo, Egypt
 Bulak, item of jewellery which is part of Garhwal (northern India) traditional attire
 Geziret Boulak (lit. Boulak Island)